SMS Kronprinz  was a unique German ironclad warship built for the Prussian Navy in 1866–1867. Kronprinz was laid down in 1866 at the Samuda Brothers shipyard at Cubitt Town in London. She was launched in May 1867 and commissioned into the Prussian Navy that September. Kronprinz was built as an armored frigate, armed with a main battery of sixteen 21 cm (8.3 in) guns; several smaller guns were added later in her career.

Kronprinz saw limited duty during the Franco-Prussian War of 1870–1871. Engine troubles aboard the ship, along with the two other armored frigates in her squadron, prevented operations against the French blockade. Only two sorties in which Kronprinz participated were conducted, both of which did not result in combat. The ship served in the subsequent Imperial Navy until she was converted into a training ship for boiler room personnel in 1901. The ship was ultimately broken up for scrap in 1921.

Design 
The purpose of the new ships would be primarily directed against Prussia's primary naval rival, Denmark, which in the recent Second Schleswig War had imposed a blockade of German ports that Prussia had not been able to break. Ironclads were at that time a recent development and the only option for sea-going warships was the armored frigate, modeled on traditional sailing ships with a battery on the broadside.

At that time, Britain and France had the shipbuilders most experienced with the type, so the navy decided to order one vessel from each country.

General characteristics and propulsion 
The ship's hull was constructed with transverse and longitudinal iron frames. It contained nine watertight compartments and a double bottom that ran for 43 percent of the length of the vessel. The ship was an excellent sea boat; the ship was responsive to commands from the helm but had a large turning radius. Steering was controlled with a single rudder. The ship's crew numbered 33 officers and 508 enlisted men. Kronprinz carried a number of smaller boats, including a large tender, two launches, a pinnace, two cutters, two yawls, and one dinghy.

The ship's propulsion system was built by John Penn and Sons of Greenwich, England. A horizontal, two-cylinder single-expansion steam engine powered the ship. It drove a two-bladed screw  in diameter. Eight trunk boilers, with four fireboxes in each, were divided into two boiler rooms. Each room was vented into its own funnel. A barque rig with a surface area of 1,980 square meters supplemented the steam engine.

Armament and armor 
As built, Kronprinz was equipped with a main battery of thirty-two rifled 72-pounder cannon. After her delivery to Germany, these guns were replaced with a pair of  L/22 guns and fourteen 21 cm L/19 guns. The two types of gun fired the same shell, of which the total supply numbered 1,656 rounds of ammunition. The fourteen L/19 guns were placed in a central battery amidships, seven on either broadside. The L/22 weapons were placed on either end of the ship as chase guns.

Later in her career, six  Hotchkiss revolver cannon in individual mounts were installed, along with five  torpedo tubes. Two of the tubes were placed in the bow, one on each broadside, and one in the stern on the port side. All were placed above water, and were supplied with a total of 12 torpedoes.

Kronprinzs armor consisted of wrought iron backed with heavy teak planking. The battery's roof was protected by  iron plating, intended to deflect shots that passed over the side of the ship or fragments from explosions.

Service history 

Kronprinz was laid down in 1866 at the Samuda Brothers shipyard in London. The British naval architect Edward Reed designed the ship, and resulted in a vessel similar to the contemporary, French-built Prussian ironclad Friedrich Carl. The ship was launched on 6 May 1867 and was commissioned into the Prussian Navy four months later on 19 September. Crews for Friedrich Carl and Kronprinz were carried to the ships by the screw frigate  and the screw corvette . On the voyage from England to Prussia, the ship lost her main mast in a storm. The ship immediately went into dock for refitting upon arrival in Kiel on 28 October; the mast was repaired and the ship's armament was converted from the initial arrangement. As with Friedrich Carl, completion of the ship was delayed significantly by problems with the new Prussian guns. The weapons originally intended for the ships used Kreiner breech blocks that had proved to be prone to failure during a series of tests in 1867–1868. Krupp-designed guns were substituted, delaying her recommissioning until 11 May 1869.

Franco-Prussian War
Kronprinz joined Friedrich Carl and the new armored frigate , the latter serving as the fleet flagship, for training exercises in August and September. In May 1870, the three ships were joined by Prinz Adalbert for a visit to Britain, though Friedrich Carl was damaged after running aground in the Great Belt. Kronprinz, König Wilhelm, and Prinz Adalbert continued on to Plymouth while Friedrich Carl returned to Kiel for repairs. The latter vessel quickly rejoined the ships there and on 1 July they departed for a training cruise to Fayal in the Azores, Portugal. But as tensions with France over the Hohenzollern candidacy for the vacant Spanish throne. While they cruised east through the English Channel, they learned of the increasing likelihood of war, and the Prussians detached Prinz Adalbert to Dartmouth to be kept informed of events. The rest of the squadron joined her there on 13 July, and as war seemed to be imminent, the Prussians ended the cruise and returned to home. Kronprinz had to take Prinz Adalbert under tow for the voyage due to the latter's slow speed.

The ships arrived back in Wilhelmshaven on 16 July, three days before France declared war on Prussia over the Ems Dispatch, initiating the Franco-Prussian War. The greatly numerically inferior Prussian Navy assumed a defensive posture against a naval blockade imposed by the French Navy. Kronprinz, Friedrich Carl, and König Wilhelm were concentrated in the North Sea at the port of Wilhelmshaven, with a view toward breaking the French blockade of the port. They were subsequently joined there by the turret ship Arminius, which had been stationed in Kiel. For the duration of the conflict, Kronprinz was commanded by Captain Reinhold von Werner. Despite the great French naval superiority, the French had conducted insufficient pre-war planning for an assault on the Prussian naval installations, and concluded that it would only be possible with Danish assistance, which was not forthcoming.

The four ships, under the command of Vizeadmiral (Vice Admiral) Eduard von Jachmann, made an offensive sortie in early August 1870 out to the Dogger Bank, though they encountered no French warships. Kronprinz and the other two broadside ironclads thereafter suffered from chronic engine trouble, which left Arminius alone to conduct operations. Kronprinz, Friedrich Carl, and König Wilhelm stood off the island of Wangerooge for the majority of the conflict, while Arminius was stationed in the mouth of the Elbe river. On 11 September, the three broadside ironclads were again ready for action; they joined Arminius for another major operation into the North Sea. It too did not encounter French opposition, as the French Navy had by this time returned to France. The Prussians planned to send Kronprinz, which had been overhauled over the winter of 1870–1871, on a raid of the port of Cherbourg in February, but the French signed the armistice that ended the war on 28 January.

Later career

Through the 1870s, the German armored fleet typically saw active service during the summer months. Over the winter, most of the vessels were placed in reserve with one or two kept in a state of reduced commission as guard ships. Kronprinz towed a floating dry dock from Swinemünde to Kiel in June 1871, with assistance from the gunboat  and the paddle steamer . At the same time, the screw corvette  was in Brazil while on an overseas cruise; some of her crew had been arrested following a fistfight in the country. The Germans threatened to deploy Kronprinz, Friedrich Carl, three more corvettes, and two gunboats, which convinced the Brazilian government to release the crewmen. The next year, the ironclad squadron—Kronprinz, Friedrich Carl, Kaiser, and the new —were sent to the Mediterranean Sea in response to the murder of the German consul in Salonika in the Ottoman Empire. The German ships were joined by French, Russian, Italian, and Austro-Hungarian warships in an international demonstration condemning the murder. The Germans returned home in August and, after arriving in September, were laid up for the winter.

Kronprinz remained laid up for the 1878 training cruise that saw the loss of the brand-new ironclad  in an accidental collision with Kaiser. The ships visited Norway on the cruise. Kronprinz was again left in reserve for 1880, but she was recommissioned in 1881 to replace the new armored corvette , which was suffering from unreliable engines. Once again, the ships remained in German waters. The next two years followed the same pattern. Engine problems plagued the ship throughout her career; Kronprinzs engines broke down during the fleet maneuvers in May 1883. Two of the three other armored frigates also broke down, which forced the cancellation of the maneuvers. Later that year, the training cycle concluded with a large-scale simulated attack on Kiel, with Kronprinz and the other ironclads acting as an "eastern" opponent. The armored fleet operated entirely under steam power that year, the first time it did so.

Kronprinz was docked for modernization in late 1883; she received new boilers and the six Hotchkiss revolver cannon and six torpedo tubes were installed. By 1884, the four s had entered service, and they formed the training squadron that year. Kronprinz had anti-torpedo nets installed in 1885; these were later removed in 1897. In 1887, she was present for the ceremonies marking the beginning of construction of the Kaiser Wilhelm Canal, which was to link the Kiel with the North Sea. The ship served on active duty with the fleet until 22 August 1901, when she was stricken from the naval register. She was reconstructed at the Imperial Dockyard in Kiel that year. The propulsion system was overhauled and the eight J Penn & Sons boilers were removed. Two Dürr and two Thornycroft boilers were installed in their place. After emerging from the reconstruction, Kronprinz served as a training ship for engine-room personnel, based in Kiel. The ship was ultimately sold to Bonn, a German ship-breaking firm, on 3 October 1921 for 5,000,000 marks. Kronprinz was broken up for scrap in Rendsburg-Audorf later that year.

Footnotes

Notes

Citations

References 

 
 
 
 
 
 
 
 

Ships of the Prussian Navy
Ships built in Cubitt Town
Ironclad warships of the Imperial German Navy
1867 ships